McHugh Forum was a 4,200-seat multi-purpose arena in Chestnut Hill, Massachusetts.  Built in 1958, it was the first on-campus home to the Boston College Eagles hockey team.  It also hosted the NCAA Frozen Four in 1963.  It closed in 1987 before the Conte Forum opened.

1958 establishments in Massachusetts
1987 disestablishments in Massachusetts
Boston College Eagles ice hockey venues
Defunct college ice hockey venues in the United States
Defunct indoor ice hockey venues in the United States
Defunct indoor arenas in Massachusetts
Sports venues completed in 1958
Sports venues in Boston